Carrigahorig is a hamlet in County Tipperary, Ireland, located  east  of Portumna on the N65 national secondary road. The northern end of the R493 terminates here. 

See also
 List of towns in the Republic of Ireland

References

Townlands of County Tipperary